Shulin is a railway station in New Taipei, Taiwan served by Taiwan Railways Administration.

Overview 
The station has two island platforms and a side platform. The side platform opened on 3 May 2007, but is only rarely used for terminating trains. The cross station-type building allows passengers to buy tickets on the second floor with connections to platforms at ground level.

History 
1901-08-25: Opened as "Shulin Dropping Station"
1902-06-01: Name changed to "Shulin Stopping Station"
1940-12: Name changed to "Shulin Station"
1955-01-01: Designated as a 2nd level (2nd) station
1966-01-01: Designated as a 2nd level (1st) station
1985-07-01: Designated as a 1st level station
1994-07-26: The old station was demolished. The station was moved into a temporary structure.
1997-03-14: Shulin Yard begins operations.
1997-09-27: The new cross-station type building opens.
2007-05-03: The third platform opens.
2008-06-20: The -Shulin segment begins trials with payment using the EasyCard.
2009-07: A lunchbox counter opens on Platform 2.
2010-03-26: EasyCard usage officially begins.

Platform configuration

Around the Station 
Night Markets
Shulin Night Market (100m to the east)
Shulin Xingren Garden Night Market (1.7km to the northwest)
Temples
Shulin Baoan Temple (350m to the northeast)
Government Offices
Shulin District Office (150m to the south)
Science and Industrial Parks
Shulin Datong Science Park (formerly Shulin Winery)
Schools
Shulin High School (1km to the south)
Shuren School of Home Economics (Private)

See also
 List of railway stations in Taiwan

References

External links 

1901 establishments in Taiwan
Railway stations opened in 1901
Railway stations served by Taiwan Railways Administration
Railway stations in New Taipei